The 2018–19 Boston Celtics season was the 73rd season of the franchise in the National Basketball Association (NBA).

In the playoffs, the Celtics swept the Indiana Pacers in the First Round. It was the first time since 2011 that the Celtics swept their opponent in the First Round.  In the Conference Semifinals, the Celtics lost to the Milwaukee Bucks in five games.

Just days before the second round matchup with the Bucks, Celtics legend John Havlicek, died on Thursday, April 25 at the age of 79. The team wore a black band with a white #17 (in honor of Havilcek) for Game 1 of the semi-final series with the Bucks which the Celtics won.

Draft picks

Roster

Standings

Division

Conference

 * notes division leader

Game log

Preseason

|- style="background:#fcc"
| 1
| September 28
| @ Charlotte
| 97–104
| Brown (14)
| Ojeleye (8)
| Horford, Irving (3)
| Dean Smith Center18,081
| 0–1
|- style="background:#cfc"
| 2
| September 30
| Charlotte
| 115–112
| Irving (20)
| Baynes, Morris (6)
| Irving, Rozier (4)
| TD Garden18,624
| 1–1
|- style="background:#fcc"
| 3
| October 2
| Cleveland
| 95–102
| Smart (15)
| Baynes (7)
| Horford (4)
| TD Garden18,624
| 1–2
|- style="background:#fcc"
| 4
| October 6
| @ Cleveland
| 102–113
| Morris, Rozier (17)
| Baynes (6)
| Horford (7)
| Quicken Loans Arena17,083
| 1–3

Regular season 

|- style="background:#cfc
| 1
| October 16
| Philadelphia
| 105–87
| Jayson Tatum (23)
| Marcus Morris (10)
| Kyrie Irving (7)
| TD Garden18,624
| 1–0
|- style="background:#fcc
| 2
| October 19
| @ Toronto
| 101–113
| Kyrie Irving (21)
| Al Horford (10)
| Kyrie Irving (6)
| Scotiabank Arena19,800
| 1–1
|- style="background:#cfc
| 3
| October 20
| @ New York
| 103–101
| Jayson Tatum (24)
| Jayson Tatum (14)
| Irving, Smart (5)
| Madison Square Garden19,427
| 2–1
|- style="background:#fcc
| 4
| October 22
| Orlando
| 90–93
| Kyrie Irving (29)
| Jayson Tatum (10)
| Kyrie Irving (5)
| TD Garden18,624
| 2–2
|- style="background:#cfc
| 5
| October 25
| @ Oklahoma City
| 101–95
| Jayson Tatum (24)
| Marcus Morris (10)
| Kyrie Irving (5)
| Chesapeake Energy Arena18,203
| 3–2
|- style="background:#cfc
| 6
| October 27
| @ Detroit
| 109–89
| Jaylen Brown (19)
| Morris, Theis (8)
| Marcus Smart (9)
| Little Caesars Arena18,120
| 4–2
|- style="background:#cfc
| 7
| October 30
| Detroit
| 108–105
| Kyrie Irving (31)
| Marcus Morris (9)
| Kyrie Irving (5)
| TD Garden18,624
| 5–2

|- style="background:#cfc
| 8
| November 1
| Milwaukee
| 117–113
| Kyrie Irving (28)
| Terry Rozier (7)
| Al Horford (8)
| TD Garden18,624
| 6–2
|- style="background:#fcc
| 9
| November 3
| @ Indiana
| 101–102
| Marcus Morris (23)
| Brown, Hayward (7)
| Marcus Smart (9)
| Bankers Life Fieldhouse17,505
| 6–3
|- style="background:#fcc
| 10
| November 5
| @ Denver
| 107–115
| Kyrie Irving (31)
| Gordon Hayward (9)
| Al Horford (6)
| Pepsi Center19,520
| 6–4
|- style="background:#cfc
| 11
| November 8
| @ Phoenix
| 116–109 (OT)
| Kyrie Irving (39)
| Morris, Tatum (8)
| Kyrie Irving (6)
| Talking Stick Resort Arena17,359
| 7–4
|- style="background:#fcc
| 12
| November 9
| @ Utah
| 115–123
| Terry Rozier (22)
| Terry Rozier (6)
| Marcus Smart (10)
| Vivint Smart Home Arena18,306
| 7–5
|- style="background:#fcc
| 13
| November 11
| @ Portland
| 94–100
| Jayson Tatum (27)
| Gordon Hayward (9)
| Kyrie Irving (6)
| Moda Center19,712
| 7–6
|- style="background:#cfc
| 14
| November 14
| Chicago
| 111–82
| Jaylen Brown (18)
| Aron Baynes (11)
| Kyrie Irving (7)
| TD Garden18,624
| 8–6
|- style="background:#cfc
| 15
| November 16
| Toronto
| 123–116 (OT)
| Kyrie Irving (43)
| Al Horford (9)
| Kyrie Irving (11)
| TD Garden18,624
| 9–6
|- style="background:#fcc
| 16
| November 17
| Utah
| 86–98
| Kyrie Irving (20)
| Kyrie Irving (8)
| Hayward, Smart, Rozier (3)
| TD Garden18,624
| 9–7
|-style="background:#fcc
| 17
| November 19
| @ Charlotte
| 112–117
| Kyrie Irving (27)
| Gordon Hayward (8)
| Kyrie Irving (11)
| Spectrum Center18,040
| 9–8
|-style="background:#fcc
| 18
| November 21
| New York
| 109–117
|Kyrie Irving (22)
|Morris, Tatum (8)
|Kyrie Irving (13)
| TD Garden18,624
| 9–9
|-style="background:#cfc
| 19
| November 23
| @ Atlanta
|114–96
| Aron Baynes (16)
| Aron Baynes (9)
| Marcus Smart (7)
| State Farm Arena15,017
| 10–9
|- style="background:#fcc;"
| 20
| November 24
| @ Dallas
| 104–113
| Jayson Tatum (21)
| Aron Baynes (9)
| Kyrie Irving (6)
| American Airlines Center20,226
| 10–10
|- style="background:#cfc;"
| 21
| November 26
| @ New Orleans
| 124–107
| Kyrie Irving (26)
| Marcus Morris (11)
| Kyrie Irving (10)
| Smoothie King Center15,189
| 11–10
|- style="background:#cfc;
| 22
| November 30
| Cleveland
| 128–95
| Kyrie Irving (29)
| Aron Baynes (9)
| Marcus Smart (7)
| TD Garden18,624
| 12–10

|- style="background:#cfc
| 23
| December 1
| @ Minnesota
| 118–109
| Gordon Hayward (30)
| Jayson Tatum (9)
| Kyrie Irving (9)
| Target Center17,663
| 13–10
|- style="background:#cfc
| 24
| December 6
| New York
| 128–100
| Kyrie Irving (22)
| Al Horford (12)
| Kyrie Irving (8)
| TD Garden18,624
| 14–10
|- style="background:#cfc
| 25
| December 8
| @ Chicago
| 133–77
| Jaylen Brown (23)
| Daniel Theis (10)
| Gordon Hayward (6)
| United Center20,923
| 15–10
|- style="background:#cfc
| 26
| December 10
| New Orleans
| 113–100
| Marcus Morris (31)
| Robert Williams III (11)
| Terry Rozier (6)
| TD Garden18,624
| 16–10
|- style="background:#cfc
| 27
| December 12
| @ Washington
| 130–125 (OT)
| Kyrie Irving (38)
| Jayson Tatum (12)
| Kyrie Irving (7)
| Capital One Arena20,409
| 17–10
|- style="background:#cfc
| 28
| December 14
| Atlanta
| 129–108
| Kyrie Irving (24)
| Theis, Rozier (7)
| Marcus Smart (7)
| TD Garden18,624
| 18–10
|- style="background:#fcc
| 29
| December 15
| @ Detroit
| 104–113
| Kyrie Irving (24)
| Irving, Tatum, Smart (8)
| Kyrie Irving (4)
| Little Caesars Arena14,500
| 18–11
|- style="background:#fcc
| 30
| December 19
| Phoenix
| 103–111
| Kyrie Irving (29)
| Williams III, Tatum (8)
| Kyrie Irving (10)
| TD Garden18,624
| 18–12
|- style="background:#fcc
| 31
| December 21
| Milwaukee
| 107–120
| Jayson Tatum (20)
| Kyrie Irving (9)
| Kyrie Irving (7)
| TD Garden18,624
| 18–13
|- style="background:#cfc
| 32
| December 23
| Charlotte
| 119–103
| Kyrie Irving (25)
| Marcus Morris (8)
| Terry Rozier (6)
| TD Garden18,624
| 19–13
|- style="background:#cfc
| 33
| December 25
| Philadelphia
| 121–114 (OT)
| Kyrie Irving (40)
| Irving, Tatum (10)
| Al Horford (5)
| TD Garden18,624
| 20–13
|- style="background:#fcc
| 34
| December 27
| @ Houston
| 113–127
| Kyrie Irving (23)
| Morris, Hayward (6)
| Kyrie Irving (11)
| Toyota Center18,055
| 20–14
|- style="background:#cfc
| 35
| December 29
| @ Memphis
| 112–103
| Kyrie Irving (26)
| Jayson Tatum (8)
| Kyrie Irving (13)
| FedExForum17,794
| 21–14
|- style="background:#fcc
| 36
| December 31
| @ San Antonio
| 111–120
| Jaylen Brown (30)
| Jayson Tatum (11)
| Kyrie Irving (8)
| AT&T Center18,354
| 21–15

|- style="background:#cfc
| 37
| January 2
| Minnesota
| 115–102
| Gordon Hayward (35)
| Horford, Brown (5)
| Marcus Smart (8)
| TD Garden18,624
| 22–15
|- style="background:#cfc
| 38
| January 4
| Dallas
| 114–93
| Jaylen Brown (21)
| Daniel Theis (13)
| Horford, Hayward (8)
| TD Garden18,624
| 23–15
|- style="background:#cfc;"
| 39
| January 7
| Brooklyn
| 116–95
| Kyrie Irving (17)
| Al Horford (9)
| Marcus Smart (7)
| TD Garden18,624
| 24–15
|- style="background:#cfc;"
| 40
| January 9
| Indiana
| 135–108
| Morris, Brown (22)
| Marcus Morris (8)
| Al Horford (8)
| TD Garden18,624
| 25–15
|- style="background:#fcc;
| 41
| January 10
| @ Miami
| 99–115
| Kyrie Irving (22)
| Morris, Rozier (6)
| Kyrie Irving (5)
| American Airlines Arena19,600
| 25–16
|- style="background:#fcc;
| 42
| January 12
| @ Orlando
| 103–105
| Kyrie Irving (25)
| Al Horford (11)
| Kyrie Irving (6)
| Amway Center18,846
| 25–17
|- style="background:#fcc
| 43
| January 14
| @ Brooklyn
| 102–109
| Jayson Tatum (34)
| Morris, Brown (6)
| Terry Rozier (5)
| Barclays Center16,247
| 25–18
|- style="background:#cfc
| 44
| January 16
| Toronto
| 117–108
| Kyrie Irving (27)
| Jayson Tatum (10)
| Kyrie Irving (18)
| TD Garden18,624
| 26–18
|- style="background:#cfc
| 45
| January 18
| Memphis
| 122–116
| Kyrie Irving (38)
| Aron Baynes (12)
| Kyrie Irving (11)
| TD Garden18,624
| 27–18
|- style="background:#cfc
| 46
| January 19
| @ Atlanta
| 113–105
| Kyrie Irving (32)
| Al Horford (9)
| Kyrie Irving (5)
| State Farm Arena16,626
| 28–18
|- style="background:#cfc
| 47
| January 21
| Miami
| 107–99
| Kyrie Irving (26)
| Al Horford (10)
| Kyrie Irving (12)
| TD Garden18,624
| 29–18
|- style="background:#cfc
| 48
| January 23
| Cleveland
| 123–103
| Terry Rozier (26)
| Terry Rozier (8)
| Terry Rozier (6)
| TD Garden18,624
| 30–18
|- style="background:#fcc
| 49
| January 26
| Golden State
| 111–115
| Kyrie Irving (32)
| Al Horford (10)
| Kyrie Irving (13)
| TD Garden18,624
| 30–19
|- style="background:#cfc
| 50
| January 28
| Brooklyn
| 112–104
| Brown, Smart (21)
| Al Horford (11)
| Smart, Rozier (7)
| TD Garden18,624
| 31–19
|- style="background:#cfc
| 51
| January 30
| Charlotte
| 126–94
| Jaylen Brown (24)
| Jaylen Brown (10)
| Terry Rozier (10)
| TD Garden18,624
| 32–19

|- style="background:#cfc
| 52
| February 1
| @ New York
| 113–99
| Kyrie Irving (23)
| Kyrie Irving (10)
| Irving, Rozier (6)
| Madison Square Garden18,343
| 33–19
|- style="background:#cfc
| 53
| February 3
| Oklahoma City
| 134–129
| Kyrie Irving (30)
| Morris, Tatum, Rozier (7)
| Kyrie Irving (11)
| TD Garden18,624
| 34–19
|- style="background:#cfc
| 54
| February 5
| @ Cleveland
| 103–96
| Jayson Tatum (25)
| Brown, Tatum (7)
| Al Horford (8)
| Quicken Loans Arena19,432
| 35–19
|- style="background:#fcc
| 55
| February 7
| L. A. Lakers
| 128–129
| Kyrie Irving (24)
| Jayson Tatum (10)
| Kyrie Irving (8)
| TD Garden18,624
| 35–20
|- style="background:#fcc
| 56
| February 9
| L. A. Clippers
| 112–123
| Gordon Hayward (19)
| Jayson Tatum (8)
| Smart, Horford (5)
| TD Garden18,624
| 35–21
|- style="background:#cfc
| 57
| February 12
| @ Philadelphia
| 112–109
| Gordon Hayward (26)
| Jayson Tatum (10)
| Rozier, Horford (5)
| Wells Fargo Center20,582
| 36–21
|- style="background:#cfc
| 58
| February 13
| Detroit
| 118–110
| Gordon Hayward (18)
| Al Horford (14)
| Hayward, Horford (8)
| TD Garden18,624
| 37–21
|- align="center"
| colspan="9" style="background:#bbcaff;" | All-Star Break
|- style="background:#fcc
| 59
| February 21
| @ Milwaukee
| 97–98
| Kyrie Irving (22)
| Al Horford (17)
| Irving, Horford (8)
| Fiserv Forum17,926
| 37–22
|- style="background:#fcc
| 60
| February 23
| @ Chicago
| 116–126
| Kyrie Irving (37)
| Morris, Smart (6)
| Kyrie Irving (10)
| United Center21,295
| 37–23
|- style="background:#fcc
| 61
| February 26
| @ Toronto
| 95–118
| Marcus Morris (15)
| Jaylen Brown (8)
| Irving, Horford (5)
| Scotiabank Arena19,800
| 37–24
|- style="background:#fcc
| 62
| February 27
| Portland
| 92–97
| Kyrie Irving (31)
| Jaylen Brown (10)
| Smart, Horford (5)
| TD Garden18,624
| 37–25

|- style="background:#cfc
| 63
| March 1
| Washington
| 107–96
| Al Horford (18)
| Marcus Morris (9)
| Kyrie Irving (12)
| TD Garden18,624
| 38–25
|- style="background:#fcc
| 64
| March 3
| Houston
| 104–115
| Kyrie Irving (24)
| Kyrie Irving (9)
| Irving, Smart (6)
| TD Garden18,624
| 38–26
|- style="background:#cfc
| 65
| March 5
| @ Golden State
| 128–95
| Gordon Hayward (30)
| Gordon Hayward (7)
| Kyrie Irving (11)
| Oracle Arena19,596
| 39–26
|- style="background:#cfc
| 66
| March 6
| @ Sacramento
| 111–109
| Jayson Tatum (24)
| Al Horford (11)
| Al Horford (7)
| Golden 1 Center17,583
| 40–26
|- style="background:#cfc
| 67
| March 9
| @ L. A. Lakers
| 120–107
| Kyrie Irving (30)
| Al Horford (8)
| Irving, Smart, Tatum (5)
| Staples Center18,997
| 41–26
|- style="background:#fcc
| 68
| March 11
| @ L. A. Clippers
| 115–140
| Terry Rozier (26)
| Jaylen Brown (7)
| Kyrie Irving (11)
| Staples Center19,068
| 41–27
|- style="background:#cfc
| 69
| March 14
| Sacramento
| 126–120
| Kyrie Irving (31)
| Marcus Morris (13)
| Kyrie Irving (12)
| TD Garden18,624
| 42–27
|- style="background:#cfc
| 70
| March 16
| Atlanta
| 129–120
| Kyrie Irving (30)
| Irving, Morris (11)
| Kyrie Irving (9)
| TD Garden18,624
| 43–27
|- style="background:#fcc
| 71
| March 18
| Denver
| 105–114
| Kyrie Irving (30)
| Jayson Tatum (7)
| Tatum, Horford (6)
| TD Garden18,624
| 43–28
|- style="background:#fcc
| 72
| March 20
| @ Philadelphia
| 115–118
| Kyrie Irving (36)
| Irving, Morris (9)
| Al Horford (5)
| Wells Fargo Center20,606
| 43–29
|- style="background:#fcc
| 73
| March 23
| @ Charlotte
| 117–124
| Kyrie Irving (31)
| Marcus Morris (9)
| Marcus Smart (8)
| Spectrum Center19,438
| 43–30
|- style="background:#fcc
| 74
| March 24
| San Antonio
| 96–115
| Marcus Smart (14)
| Gordon Hayward (10)
| Kyrie Irving (12)
| TD Garden18,624
| 43–31
|- style="background:#cfc
| 75
| March 26
| @ Cleveland
| 116–106
| Smart, Tatum (21)
| Al Horford (8)
| Al Horford (5)
| Quicken Loans Arena19,432
| 44–31
|- style="background:#cfc
| 76
| March 29
| Indiana
| 114–112
| Kyrie Irving (30)
| Aron Baynes (13)
| Marcus Smart (6)
| TD Garden18,624
| 45–31
|- style="background:#fcc
| 77
| March 30
| @ Brooklyn
| 96–110
| Gordon Hayward (19)
| Hayward, Brown (6)
| Terry Rozier (4)
| Barclays Center17,732
| 45–32

|- style="background:#cfc
| 78
| April 1
| Miami
| 110–105
| Kyrie Irving (25)
| Baynes, Horford (11)
| Al Horford (10)
| TD Garden18,624
| 46–32
|- style="background:#cfc
| 79
| April 3
| @ Miami
| 112–102
| Gordon Hayward (25)
| Aron Baynes (10)
| Gordon Hayward (5)
| American Airlines Arena19,904
| 47–32
|- style="background:#cfc
| 80
| April 5
| @ Indiana
| 117–97
| Jayson Tatum (22)
| Aron Baynes (11)
| Kyrie Irving (6)
| Bankers Life Fieldhouse17,371
| 48–32
|- style="background:#fcc
| 81
| April 7
| Orlando
| 108–116
| Kyrie Irving (23)
| Marcus Morris (8)
| Al Horford (7)
| TD Garden18,624
| 48–33
|- style="background:#cfc
| 82
| April 9
| @ Washington
| 116–110
| Terry Rozier (21)
| Dozier, Williams (11)
| Brad Wanamaker (7)
| Capital One Arena20,409
| 49–33

Playoffs

|- style="background:#cfc;"
| 1
| April 14
| Indiana
| 84–74
| Irving, Morris (20)
| Al Horford (11)
| Kyrie Irving (7)
| TD Garden18,624
| 1–0
|- style="background:#cfc;"
| 2
| April 17
| Indiana
| 99–91
| Kyrie Irving (37)
| Al Horford (10)
| Kyrie Irving (7)
| TD Garden18,624
| 2–0
|- style="background:#cfc;"
| 3
| April 19
| @ Indiana
| 104–96
| Jaylen Brown (23)
| Al Horford (8)
| Kyrie Irving (10)
| Bankers Life Fieldhouse17,923
| 3–0
|- style="background:#cfc;"
| 4
| April 21
| @ Indiana
| 110–106
| Gordon Hayward (20)
| Al Horford (12)
| Kyrie Irving (7)
| Bankers Life Fieldhouse17,923
| 4–0

|- style="background:#cfc;"
| 1
| April 28
| @ Milwaukee
| 112–90
| Kyrie Irving (26)
| Al Horford (11)
| Kyrie Irving (11)
| Fiserv Forum17,341
| 1–0
|- style="background:#fcc;"
| 2
| April 30
| @ Milwaukee
| 102–123
| Marcus Morris (17)
| Horford, Rozier (8)
| Kyrie Irving (4)
| Fiserv Forum17,536
| 1–1
|- style="background:#fcc;"
| 3
| May 3
| Milwaukee
| 116–123
| Kyrie Irving (29)
| Jayson Tatum (11)
| Kyrie Irving (6)
| TD Garden18,624
| 1–2
|- style="background:#fcc;"
| 4
| May 6
| Milwaukee
| 101–113
| Kyrie Irving (23)
| Marcus Morris (14)
| Kyrie Irving (10)
| TD Garden18,624
| 1–3
|- style="background:#fcc;"
| 5
| May 8
| @ Milwaukee
| 91–116
| Kyrie Irving (15)
| Marcus Morris (11)
| Al Horford (6)
| Fiserv Forum17,701
| 1–4

Player statistics

Regular season

|-
| align="left"| || align="center"| C
| 51 || 18 || 821 || 240 || 57 || 12 || 34 || 284
|-
| align="left"| || align="center"| SG
| 74 || 25 || 1,913 || 313 || 100 || 69 || 32 || 964
|-
| align="left"| || align="center"| SG
| 6 || 0 || 51 || 17 || 5 || 2 || 0 || 19
|-
| align="left"| || align="center"| PF
| 72 || 18 || 1,863 || 322 || 244 || 62 || 23 || 825
|-
| align="left"| || align="center"| C
| 68 || 68 || 1,973 || 458 || 283 || 59 || style=";"|86 || 925
|-
| align="left"|≠ || align="center"| SG
| 1 || 0 || 26 || 3 || 3 || 1 || 0 || 17
|-
| align="left"| || align="center"| PG
| 67 || 67 || 2,214 || 335 || style=";"|464 || 103 || 34 || style=";"|1,596
|-
| align="left"|≠ || align="center"| C
| 2 || 0 || 5 || 3 || 1 || 0 || 0 || 6
|-
| align="left"| || align="center"| PF
| 75 || 53 || 2,091 || 458 || 109 || 43 || 25 || 1,046
|-
| align="left"| || align="center"| PF
| 56 || 3 || 594 || 86 || 23 || 10 || 4 || 186
|-
| align="left"| || align="center"| PG
| 79 || 14 || 1,791 || 307 || 231 || 68 || 21 || 708
|-
| align="left"| || align="center"| SG
| style=";"|80 || 60 || 2,200 || 234 || 321 || style=";"|143 || 28 || 708
|-
| align="left"| || align="center"| SF
| 79 || style=";"|79 || style=";"|2,455 || style=";"|477 || 168 || 84 || 57 || 1,243
|-
| align="left"| || align="center"| C
| 66 || 2 || 908 || 225 || 68 || 21 || 42 || 374
|-
| align="left"| || align="center"| PG
| 36 || 0 || 343 || 41 || 56 || 12 || 2 || 140
|-
| align="left"| || align="center"| C
| 32 || 2 || 283 || 81 || 7 || 9 || 40 || 81
|-
| align="left"| || align="center"| PF
| 41 || 1 || 251 || 53 || 15 || 8 || 7 || 94
|}
After all games.
‡Waived during the season
†Traded during the season
≠Acquired during the season

Playoffs

|-
| align="left"| || align="center"| C
| style=";"|9 || 5 || 115 || 25 || 3 || 3 || 3 || 19
|-
| align="left"| || align="center"| SG
| style=";"|9 || style=";"|9 || 274 || 52 || 10 || 6 || 2 || 125
|-
| align="left"| || align="center"| PF
| style=";"|9 || 0 || 267 || 36 || 22 || 6 || 3 || 86
|-
| align="left"| || align="center"| C
| style=";"|9 || style=";"|9 || 310 || style=";"|81 || 40 || 4 || style=";"|7 || 125
|-
| align="left"| || align="center"| PG
| style=";"|9 || style=";"|9 || style=";"|330 || 40 || style=";"|63 || style=";"|12 || 4 || style=";"|192
|-
| align="left"| || align="center"| PF
| style=";"|9 || 4 || 254 || 73 || 11 || 1 || 5 || 123
|-
| align="left"| || align="center"| PF
| 6 || 0 || 34 || 2 || 2 || 0 || 0 || 13
|-
| align="left"| || align="center"| PG
| style=";"|9 || 0 || 162 || 39 || 17 || 4 || 2 || 58
|-
| align="left"| || align="center"| SG
| 2 || 0 || 32 || 4 || 4 || 3 || 0 || 7
|-
| align="left"| || align="center"| SF
| style=";"|9 || style=";"|9 || 295 || 60 || 17 || 10 || style=";"|7 || 137
|-
| align="left"| || align="center"| C
| 7 || 0 || 42 || 10 || 0 || 1 || 1 || 12
|-
| align="left"| || align="center"| PG
| 4 || 0 || 17 || 1 || 3 || 1 || 0 || 10
|-
| align="left"| || align="center"| C
| 3 || 0 || 13 || 7 || 0 || 0 || 0 || 4
|-
| align="left"| || align="center"| PF
| 4 || 0 || 14 || 2 || 1 || 0 || 1 || 8
|}

Transactions

Trades

Free agency

Re-signed

Additions

Subtractions

References

Boston Celtics seasons
Boston Celtics
Boston Celtics
Boston Celtics
Celtics
Celtics